This is a list of mayors of Hanover with their titles.

1818–1820: Dr. Christian Philipp Iffland, dirig. Bürgermeister der Altstadt
1818–1824: Johann Friedrich Kaufmann, Bürgermeister der Neustadt und ab 1820 Gerichtsschulze der Alt- und Neustadt
1818–1820: Ludwig Christian Zwicker, Bürgermeister
1822–1824: Georg Ernst Friedrich Hoppenstedt, Stadtdirektor
1824–1843: Rudolf Wilhelm Rumann, Stadtdirektor
1843–1853: Carl Friedrich Wilhelm Evers, Stadtdirektor
1854–1882: Johann Carl Hermann Rasch, Stadtdirektor
1883–1891: Ferdinand John Georg Haltenhoff, Stadtdirektor
1891–1918: Heinrich Tramm, Stadtdirektor
1918–1924: Robert Leinert, Oberbürgermeister
1925: Gustav Fink, Bürgermeister
1925–1937: Dr. Arthur Menge, Oberbürgermeister
1937: Heinrich Müller, Bürgermeister
1938–1942: Dr. Henricus Haltenhoff, Oberbürgermeister
1942–1944: Ludwig Hoffmeister, Staatskommissar
1943–1945: Egon Bönner, Bürgermeister und Staatskommissar
1945–1946: Gustav Bratke, kommissarischer Oberbürgermeister
1946: Franz Henkel, Oberbürgermeister
1946–1956: Wilhelm Weber, Oberbürgermeister
1956–1972: August Holweg, Oberbürgermeister
1972–2006: Dr. h.c. Herbert Schmalstieg, Oberbürgermeister
2006–2013: Stephan Weil, Oberbürgermeister
2013–2019: Stefan Schostok, Oberbürgermeister
incumbent since 2019: Belit Onay, Oberbürgermeister

See also
 Timeline of Hanover

References

 
Hanover
Hanover, mayors